Bo Kristoffer Nordfeldt (born 23 June 1989) is a Swedish professional footballer who plays as a goalkeeper for AIK and the Swedish national team.

Club career

IF Brommapojkarna
Nordfeldt began his career in IF Brommapojkarna, famous for its academy. He was promoted to the first team for the season of 2006, when the team was playing in Superettan. Nordfeldt did not play any league matches that year or the following year when the team was playing for the first time in Allsvenskan.

In 2008, IF Brommapojkarna were back in Superettan and both goalkeepers, Mattias Asper and Kristoffer Björklund, had left the club. Nordfeldt started his first year as a senior and when the season ended, the club had seen a promotion back to the Allsvenskan. He had started 29 out of 30 league matches, conceding 27 goals, and achieving 12 clean sheets. Nordfeldt signed a new contract in the beginning of 2009, keeping him at the club until 2012. As newcomers for the season of 2009, the club was seen as favourites for relegation, but finished a comfortable 12th. He made 21 league appearances, conceding 31 goals and keeping six clean sheets.

On 2 August 2010, there were several scouts spotted at Grimsta to watch the match between IF Brommapojkarna and the league leaders Helsingborgs IF. The clubs thought to be interested in Nordfeldt were Ajax, Borussia Mönchengladbach, Hannover 96, Heerenveen, and Sampdoria.

Heerenveen
On 6 March 2012, Nordfeldt signed a three-and-a-half-year-deal at Dutch top flight club SC Heerenveen. He featured over 100 times for the Dutch side, helping them reach the Eredivisie play-offs for Europa League qualification in each of his three seasons at the club.

Swansea City
On 23 June 2015, Nordfeldt signed for Premier League side Swansea City on a three-year-deal for an undisclosed fee. He was signed to compete with Łukasz Fabiański for the starting position, following the departures of goalkeepers Gerhard Tremmel and David Cornell earlier in that transfer window. Nordfeldt made his Swansea City debut on Tuesday 25 August in their League Cup match against York City where he played the full 90 minutes in a 3–0 win which resulted in his first clean sheet for the club. Nordfeldt made his Premier League debut in the last match of the season against Manchester City.

International career
Between 2008 and 2010, Nordfeldt played 16 matches for the Swedish U21-team. In the race for the 2011 U21 European Championships, Sweden played 8 matches in their qualification group and 2 in the play-offs, all with Nordfeldt in the starting lineup, with a goal difference of 17–10.

Nordfeldt made his debut for Sweden on 22 January 2011 in a friendly match against South Africa Development team.

In May 2018, he was named in Sweden's 23 man squad for the 2018 FIFA World Cup in Russia.

Nordfeldt was included in Sweden's 26-man squad for UEFA Euro 2020.

Career statistics

Club

 Appearances in the EFL Trophy.

International

References

External links
Swansea City Profile

 

1989 births
Living people
Footballers from Stockholm
Swedish footballers
Sweden youth international footballers
Sweden under-21 international footballers
Sweden international footballers
Association football goalkeepers
IF Brommapojkarna players
SC Heerenveen players
Swansea City A.F.C. players
Gençlerbirliği S.K. footballers
AIK Fotboll players
Superettan players
Allsvenskan players
Eredivisie players
Premier League players
English Football League players
Süper Lig players
2018 FIFA World Cup players
UEFA Euro 2020 players
Swedish expatriate footballers
Expatriate footballers in the Netherlands
Expatriate footballers in Wales
Expatriate footballers in Turkey
Swedish expatriate sportspeople in the Netherlands
Swedish expatriate sportspeople in the United Kingdom